Clive Nolan Murray (born December 5, 1990) is a footballer from Grenada, who is currently playing for Paradise FC International in the GFA Premier Division.

Early life 
He was born in the parish of St. Patricks and was raised in the village of Mt. Rich by his mother Nola Murray. Murray attended the Hermitage Government School after those 7 years he then went on to the St. Andrews Anglican Secondary school representing the school in both cricket and soccer. Since he had a passion for soccer he followed his heart and developed his self mainly in that area. He also represented his school in track and field events at the Intercol Games, which is held annually for the school athletes around Grenada. Besides being a great athlete, he also excelled academically, acquiring all subjects he attempted in the CXC annual exam.

Career

Club 
He started his professional career with the Mt. Rich Football Club, a second division club, where he developed his innate skills and was in the top three in the league in assists and goals, the leading scorer being his teammate Claude 'Suger' James. Getting national attention, he was persuaded to join ASOMS Paradise FC in July 2010, who made his debut in the Premier Division.

On 7 February 2012, he left Grenada and signed in Thailand for Roi Et United F.C. of the Thai Regional League North-East Division.

International 
Murray is a member of the Grenada national football team and was the first player to score for Grenada in a CONCACAF Gold Cup. He did it on 10 June 2011, scoring the opening goal of the game against Honduras at the FIU Stadium in Miami, in the 2011 edition. However his goal only secured the lead for 8 minutes before Honduras scored seven goals of their own giving a final score of 1–7.

International goals
Scores and results list Grenada's goal tally first.

|- 
| 1. || rowspan=2|May 27, 2011 || rowspan=2|Grenada National Stadium, St. George's, Grenada || rowspan=2| || 1–0 || rowspan=2|2–2 || rowspan=2|Friendly
|-
| 2. || 2–0 
|-
| 3. || June 10, 2011 || FIU Stadium, Miami, United States ||  || 1–0 || 1–7 || 2011 CONCACAF Gold Cup
|-
| 4. || October 7, 2011 || FFB Field, Belmopan, Belize ||  || 4–0 || 4–1 || 2014 FIFA World Cup qualification – CONCACAF Second Round
|-
|}

References

External links
 
 

Living people
1990 births
Grenadian footballers
Grenada international footballers
2011 CONCACAF Gold Cup players
Grenadian expatriate footballers
Expatriate footballers in Thailand
Association football forwards
Grenada under-20 international footballers
Grenada youth international footballers